Stephen "Jo Jo" English (born February 4, 1970) is an American professional basketball player who starred at the University of South Carolina in the early 1990s and later played parts of three seasons for the National Basketball Association's Chicago Bulls. English made his NBA debut on December 2, 1992. He was the top scorer in the 1999–2000 Israel Basketball Premier League.

Basketball career
A 6'4" guard, English is perhaps best remembered for being involved in a bench-clearing brawl with Derek Harper of the New York Knicks during a 1994 NBA Eastern Conference Semifinals playoff game at Chicago Stadium.  With NBA Commissioner David Stern in attendance, English and Harper carried their fight into the stands and were subsequently punished with one and two-game suspensions, respectively.

English played just eight games in the following season and later joined the minor-league Continental Basketball Association. He also played for the Adelaide 36ers in the Australian National Basketball League during 1995, averaging 14.8 points in 21 games. He later played in Turkey for two seasons, and in Israel for one season. He was the top scorer in the 1999–2000 Israel Basketball Premier League.

References

External links
Career stats at https://www.basketball-reference.com

1970 births
Living people
Sportspeople from Frankfurt
Adelaide 36ers players
African-American basketball players
American expatriate basketball people in Australia
American expatriate basketball people in France
American expatriate basketball people in Israel
American expatriate basketball people in Turkey
American men's basketball players
Besançon BCD players
Beşiktaş men's basketball players
Chicago Bulls players
Israeli Basketball Premier League players
La Crosse Bobcats players
La Crosse Catbirds players
Maccabi Kiryat Motzkin basketball players
National Basketball Association players from Germany
German men's basketball players
Rockford Lightning players
Shooting guards
SIG Basket players
South Carolina Gamecocks men's basketball players
Tri-City Chinook players
Undrafted National Basketball Association players
Yakima Sun Kings players
American expatriate basketball people in the Philippines
Philippine Basketball Association imports
Sta. Lucia Realtors players
21st-century African-American sportspeople
20th-century African-American sportspeople